Nabil Hamouda (born 4 January 1983 in Lakhdaria, Algeria) is an Algerian footballer. He currently plays as a midfielder for JS Kabylie in the Algerian league.

Club career
 2001-2005 RC Kouba
 2005-2007 Paradou AC
 2007-pres. JS Kabylie

Honours
 Won the Algerian League once with JS Kabylie in 2008

External links
 JS Kabylie Profile
 DZFoot Profile

1983 births
Algerian footballers
Living people
Kabyle people
JS Kabylie players
Paradou AC players
RC Kouba players
Algeria under-23 international footballers
People from Bouïra Province
Algeria youth international footballers
Association football midfielders
21st-century Algerian people